Pauline Fossil is a fictional character from the 1936 children's book Ballet Shoes by Noel Streatfeild. In the 2007 film adaption she is played by Emma Watson, and in the 1975 TV serial she is played by Elizabeth Morgan.

Character biography 
Pauline is the eldest of the three Fossil girls, all of whom are orphaned as infants. Professor Matthew Brown finds her alone in a lifeboat when the ship he was traveling on sinks. He rescues her and takes her to his home in London, where he adopts her in the name of his great-niece, Sylvia Brown. She is named Pauline after the Apostle Paul, who was also rescued from the waves. With pale blonde hair and blue eyes, Pauline is considered the beauty of the family, and is declared by many characters in later books to be the prettiest girl they have ever seen. As the eldest of the three girls, she is often the one who takes the lead in decision-making.

Pauline lives in London, England. She begins attending school when she is six years old, but is forced to leave when Sylvia, as her guardian, can no longer pay the school fees. She is then tutored for free by Dr. Jakes and Dr. Smith, who are boarders in the house of her guardian. Another boarder, Miss Theo Dane, suggests that all three girls go to the Children's Academy of Dancing and Stage Training, in order to earn an income when they become old enough to work. Pauline is enrolled with her sisters, Petrova and Posy, and when she is ten, she shows some promise in dancing. However, it is her acting ability that set her apart, soon becoming the best actress in her class.

Her first role on stage is Tyltyl, in the Maeterlinck play, The Blue Bird. When she is twelve, she auditions for her first professional role, Alice in Alice's Adventures in Wonderland. Due to Pauline's increasing conceit during the rehearsal process and early showings of the play, the director eventually replaces Pauline with her understudy, Winifred, teaching Pauline a lesson in humility.  After Alice, she becomes a successful theater actress, playing Peaseblossom alongside Petrova in A Midsummer Night's Dream, and the future King Edward V in Richard III.

Her performance in Richard III leads to her being discovered by a film director. She screentests for the role of Princess Henrietta of England in a film about King Charles II, but finds it difficult to adapt to film after being trained for the stage. After the film, a smash hit, is released, Pauline returns to the theater for the last time, playing the Fairy Godmother in Cinderella. Because of her promising ability in the role of Henrietta, Pauline is asked to sign a contract with a Hollywood studio, and later moves to California, accompanied by Sylvia, her guardian. Later books of Streatfeild's detail how Pauline rises to be one of Hollywood's greatest stars, particularly during the war period, and pictures of her in her films become popular souvenirs

External links

References 

Literary characters introduced in 1936
Characters in British novels of the 20th century
Fictional actors
Fictional adoptees
Child characters in literature